Norby is a fictional robot created by Janet and Isaac Asimov. Norby may also refer to
Norby, the Mixed-Up Robot (1983), the first book in the Norby series by Janet and Isaac Asimov
Norby (TV series), American sitcom television series
Norby (name)

See also
Norrby (disambiguation)